Víctor García (born 10 March 1990 in Madrid) is a professional racing driver from Spain.

Career

Karting
García began his karting career in the late 1990s, starting out in the cadet ranks before working his way up to Spanish and European Championship ICA status. The highlight of his career came in 2003 when he won both the Spanish Yamaha and Valencia District Yamaha championships.

Formula Three
García made his single-seater debut in late 2006, racing in the final four races of the Spanish Formula Three Championship season in the secondary Copa F300 class. The following year he raced a full season in the main Class A, driving for the GTA Motor Competición team. He finished the season in eleventh place, taking a podium place at the first round in Jarama as well as six other points-scoring positions.

2008 saw García remain in the series for a second full season, racing for Escuderia TEC-Auto, who had won the title the previous season with Máximo Cortés. Two podiums at the first round at Jarama saw García lead the championship early on, but his results began to fade and he switched teams mid-season, joining Italian outfit RP Motorsport for the final four rounds. He eventually finished the season in 15th place.

García remained in Formula Three for 2009, this time switching to the British series with Fortec Motorsport. He finished in the points on nine occasions to finish 14th in the standings. Despite finishing seventh in the first race at Spa-Francorchamps, he was classified in third position due to a number of guest drivers finishing ahead of him, who were ineligible for championship points.

During the year, García also took part in the two famous non-championship Formula Three races, the Masters of Formula Three at Zandvoort, where he took 22nd place, and the Macau Grand Prix, where he finished eleventh, the second highest British series runner behind Renger van der Zande.

In October 2009, García made his debut in the final Formula Three Euroseries round of the season at Hockenheim with Prema Powerteam. He finished the first race in ninth, just missing out on the reverse-grid pole position for the second race, in which he retired.

Formula Renault
In 2008, García contested a one-off round of the Eurocup Formula Renault 2.0 championship at the Hungaroring. Driving for Prema Powerteam, he finished fifteenth in the first race before retiring from the second event.

Formula Renault 3.5 Series

In late 2009, García took part in Formula Renault 3.5 Series collective testing at Motorland Aragón and Barcelona, driving cars for Prema Powerteam, Mofaz Racing and Draco Racing and in February 2010, it was announced that he would drive for new team KMP Racing in the 2010 season, partnering Russian Anton Nebylitskiy. He finished 24th in points with a best finish of eighth in Race 1 at Silverstone Circuit.

Indy Lights
For 2011 García has signed on to drive in the American Firestone Indy Lights series with Team Moore Racing. He won the second race of the season at Barber Motorsports Park.

Other series
In the autumn of 2009, García sampled a GP2 car for the first time, testing for the DPR team at Jerez in Spain.

Racing record

Career summary

 * Season still in progress.

† - As García was a guest driver, he was ineligible to score points.

Complete Formula Renault 3.5 Series results
(key)

American open–wheel racing results
(key) (Races in bold indicate pole position) (Races in italics indicate fastest lap)

Indy Lights

References

External links

Official site
Career details from Driver Database

1990 births
Living people
Sportspeople from Madrid
Spanish racing drivers
British Formula Three Championship drivers
Euroformula Open Championship drivers
Formula 3 Euro Series drivers
Formula Renault Eurocup drivers
World Series Formula V8 3.5 drivers
Indy Lights drivers
Spanish GP3 Series drivers
Prema Powerteam drivers
RP Motorsport drivers
Fortec Motorsport drivers
Team Moore Racing drivers